The USCGC Hornbeam (WLB-394) was an  belonging to the United States Coast Guard launched on 14 August 1943 and commissioned on 14 April 1944.

Design
The Iris-class buoy tenders were constructed after the Mesquite-class buoy tenders. She was powered by one electric motor. This was connected up to two Westinghouse generators which were driven by two Cooper Bessemer GND-8 four-cycle diesel engines. She had a single screw.

The ships had a complement of six officers and seventy-four crew members in 1945; this decreased to two warrants, four officers, and forty-seven men in 1966. They were fitted with a SL1 radar system and QBE-3A sonar system in 1945. Their armament consisted of one 3"/50 caliber gun, two 20 mm/80 guns, two Mousetraps, two depth charge tracks, and four Y-guns in 1945; these were removed in 1966.

Career 

During World War II Hornbeam initially served on the Great Lakes where she was used for ATON and ice-breaking. From August 1944, until the war's end in 1945, the cutter was assigned to the First Coast Guard District and stationed at Woods Hole.

On 25 July 1956 Hornbeam participated in the rescue operations after the collision of the ocean liner Andrea Doria with the ship Stockholm.

After the war, Hornbeam stayed in Woods Hole until July 1976.

From July 1976, through 29 April 1977, the ship underwent an overhaul at the Coast Guard Yard at Curtis Bay, MD. From 29 April 1977, Hornbeam was stationed at Cape May, NJ, and used as an Aids to Navigation Boat. In January and February 1994, Hornbeam, during a record cold spell, spent seven weeks breaking ice and installing ice buoys in the Delaware Bay and Delaware River.
She was decommissioned on 30 September 1999, and put up for sale.

M/V Rum Cay Grace
In January 2009, Hornbeam was purchased by Integrated Technologies & Systems, Ltd and rechristened M/V Rum Cay Grace, getting underway in February for Rum Cay, Bahamas. Along the way, the crew spotted and salvaged a US Navy Northrop BQM-74 Chukar target drone.
Rum Cay Grace transported emergency relief supplies from Miami, Florida, following the 2010 Haiti earthquake. Following her relief efforts, while anchored in Port-au-Prince, Rum Cay Grace was stolen by smugglers and abandoned near the Panama Canal. She and six other ships broke loose from their moorings and were driven onto the rocks in 2013.

See also
 List of United States Coast Guard cutters

References

Iris-class seagoing buoy tenders
1943 ships
Ships built in Duluth, Minnesota